Bethune–Cookman University (BCU or Bethune–Cookman) is a private historically black university in Daytona Beach, Florida. Bethune–Cookman University is affiliated with the United Methodist Church. The primary administration building, White Hall, and the Mary McLeod Bethune Home are two historic locations.

History 

Mary McLeod Bethune founded the Daytona Educational and Industrial Training School for Negro Girls in 1904. The first students met in the home of John Henry and Alice Smith Williams.  The school underwent growth and development through the years. In 1923, it merged with the Cookman Institute of Jacksonville, Florida, founded in 1872, and became a co-ed high school. Bethune-Cookman College is a result of the merger in 1923 of the Daytona Normal and Industrial Institute for Girls, founded in 1904 by Dr. Mary McLeod Bethune and Cookman Institute for Boys, founded in Jacksonville in 1872 by Rev. D.S. Darnell.  The new institution, called the Daytona Cookman Collegiate Institute, became affiliated with the Board of Education of the Methodist Church. By 1931 the school had become a junior college.

In 1941, a four-year degree program was developed in liberal arts and teacher training. The school became a four-year college in 1941 when the Florida Department of Education approved a four-year baccalaureate program in Liberal Arts and Teacher Education. The name was changed to Bethune–Cookman College. In 1943, two years later, the first group of graduates received a Bachelor of Science Degree in Elementary Education.  In 1947, the college received an "A" rating from the Southern Association of Colleges and Schools and the Florida State Department of Education. In 1988, Bethune-Cookman College was admitted to candidacy status by the Southern Association of Colleges and Schools to offer a master's degree in science education. 
 
On February 14, 2007, the Board of Trustees approved a name change to Bethune–Cookman University.

In May 2017, Bethune–Cookman University faced criticism when it invited Betsy DeVos to speak at the commencement. Students and public outcry created a petition on change.org titled "Stop Betsy DeVos from delivering the commencement address at Bethune-Cookman University". Many questioned the school's decision on social media and beyond, accusing Betsy DeVos of undermining historically black colleges and universities. The incident led to security measures, including alerts on the school's website on allowed bags. The university homepage stated, "Commencement Bag Policy: All bags will be searched prior to entry into the Ocean Center...". During her address, a majority of the crowd booed DeVos, with students standing up and turning their backs to her.

The university was placed on probation by its regional accreditor, the Southern Association of Colleges and Schools, in the summer of 2018. The accreditor cited failings in multiple areas, including integrity, governing board characteristics, financial resources, financial responsibility, and control of finances. The accreditation action followed significant financial losses by the university - $28 million over the previous two years - and multiple lawsuits, including one filed by the university against a former president alleging fraud and bribery related to a $306 million construction deal.  The nursing program had been placed on probation by its accreditor a few months earlier, related to academic issues. In September 2020, the university was taken off probation and maintained its accreditation.

Presidents 

Bethune retired in 1942, at which time James A. Colston became president. In 1946 Bethune resumed the presidency for a year.

Richard V. Moore Sr. became president in 1947. During his tenure, the college was accredited in 1970 by the Southern Association of Colleges and Schools. It joined the United Negro College Fund and other academic and professional organizations. The curriculum expanded, student enrollment increased, and new buildings were constructed for residential housing and classrooms.

Oswald P. Bronson Sr., a B–CU alumnus, served as the fourth president of the college from 1975 to 2004. During his tenure increased student enrollment led to the construction of more student housing, classroom buildings, and the Mary Mcleod Bethune Auditorium. Major fields of study increased from 12 in 1975 to 37 by 2004. In addition, seven continuing education centers were established throughout the state. While maintaining accreditation, the Florida Board of Education added new accreditation in the Nursing and Teacher Education programs.

In August 2004, Trudie Kibbe Reed was appointed to the presidency. She was the first woman president since Bethune. Campus improvements have included the construction of the Center for Civic Engagement, the L. Gale Lemerand School of Nursing, the creation of the Alexis Pugh and Eugene Zimmerman Scholarship houses, and the provision of a university-owned house as an alumni center during her tenure.

Edison O. Jackson was appointed as the university's interim president in May 2012.  Jackson was appointed to the presidency in May 2013 and was committed to serving a 6-year term. In July 2017, Jackson announced his resignation and the Board of Trustees appointed retired judge Hubert L. Grimes as the Interim President. In January 2018, the university sued Jackson and others involved in a $306 million construction deal alleging fraud, corruption, and bribery.

E. LaBrent Chrite, Ph.D., former dean of the Daniels College of Business at the University of Denver, became the seventh president of B–CU on July 1, 2019.

Academics 
Bethune–Cookman University offers 39 bachelor's degrees and six master's degrees through one of the following schools and colleges: 

Nursing
Business & Entrepreneurship
Education
Graduate Studies
Health Sciences
Hospitality Management
Liberal Arts
Online & Professional Studies
Performing Arts & Communication
Science, Engineering, Mathematics
Undergraduate Studies
Religion

Library
The Harrison Rhodes Memorial Library was the original library of Bethune–Cookman College which was a tribute to author Harrison Rhodes of the wealthy Rhodes family. Harrison, along with his sister Margaret, championed the then Daytona Normal and Industrial School for Negro Girls. Upon Margaret's death, the balance of the Rhodes estate, some $560,000, was given to Bethune–Cookman College. The Harrison Rhodes Memorial building still exists as a campus hall after having been replaced by the Carl S. Swisher Library in 1941, which was mainly financed by the wealthy tobacco industrialist and philanthropist Carl S. Swisher.

Athletics 

Bethune-Cookman is a member of the Southwestern Athletic Conference (SWAC) and participates in NCAA Division I FCS.  Bethune-Cookman sponsors 15 athletic programs.

Student organizations

Bethune-Cookman has more than 80 student organizations on campus. This includes academic and honor societies, Greek fraternities and sororities, Greek-letter professional and service organizations, community service groups, leadership organizations, performance groups, and international and religious-based organizations.

The Marching Wildcats

Bethune-Cookman's marching band is known as "The Marching Wildcats."  The marching band is the largest student organization on campus with over 300 members and starred in the Netflix series Marching Orders.

The marching band organization began in 1930 with only 30 instrumentalists.

See also 
 List of Bethune–Cookman University alumni
 Independent Colleges and Universities of Florida

Notes

References

External links 

 
 Bethune–Cookman Athletics website

 
Buildings and structures in Daytona Beach, Florida
Educational institutions established in 1904
Historically black universities and colleges in the United States
Universities and colleges affiliated with the United Methodist Church
Universities and colleges in Volusia County, Florida
Liberal arts colleges in Florida
1904 establishments in Florida
Private universities and colleges in Florida